Thérèse Tanguay-Dion,  ( Tanguay; March 20, 1927 – January 17, 2020), popularly known as Maman Dion ("Mommy Dion" in French), was a Canadian television personality and the mother of singer Celine Dion.

She was born on the Gaspé Peninsula, in Saint-Bernard-des-Lacs, Quebec, as was her husband, Adhémar-Charles Dion. Her parents were Antoinette (née Sergerie) and Laureat Achille Tanguay.

Already well known in Quebec as a stage mother involved in her daughter's career, she later launched her own line of food products, Pâtés de Maman Dion, and became host of a cooking show for TVA. She was also a sponsor of the Fondation Maman Dion which was founded in 2006, an educational foundation which provides school supplies, clothing and eyewear to underprivileged children.

Children

Thérèse and Adhémar had 14 children:

 Denise Dion (born August 16, 1946)
 Clement Dion (born November 2, 1947)
 Claudette Dion (born December 10, 1948)
 Liette Dion (born February 8, 1950)
 Michel Dion (born August 18, 1952)
 Louise Dion (born September 22, 1953)
 Jacques Dion (born March 10, 1955)
 Daniel Dion (November 29, 1956 – January 16, 2016)
 Ghislaine Dion (born July 28, 1958)
 Linda Dion (born June 23, 1959)
 Manon Dion (born October 7, 1960)
 Paul Dion (born April 3, 1962)
 Pauline Dion (born April 3, 1962)
 Celine Dion (born March 30, 1968)

Death 
Thérèse Tanguay-Dion died on January 17, 2020, of Alzheimer’s resulting in dementia. She was 92.

References 

 

1927 births
2020 deaths
Businesspeople from Quebec
Canadian television chefs
Canadian women philanthropists
Celine Dion
French Quebecers
People from Gaspésie–Îles-de-la-Madeleine
Philanthropists from Quebec
Women chefs